Eupithecia firmata is a moth in the family Geometridae. It is found in Pakistan and India.

The wingspan is about 16–22 mm. The forewings are grey and the hindwings are lighter pale grey.

References

Moths described in 2008
firmata
Moths of Asia